Carl Schilling (21 October 1872, Kalvi Parish (now Viru-Nigula Parish), Wierland County – 8 October 1941, Schweinfurt, Germany) was an Estonian politician. He was a member of II Riigikogu. He was a member of the Riigikogu from 7 June 1923. He replaced Johann Meier.

References

1872 births
1941 deaths
People from Viru-Nigula Parish
People from Kreis Wierland
Baltic-German people
German-Baltic Party politicians
Members of the Riigikogu, 1923–1926
Members of the Riigikogu, 1926–1929
Members of the Riigikogu, 1929–1932
Members of the Riigikogu, 1932–1934
Estonian emigrants to Germany